Polaris is the debut studio album by South Korean singer-songwriter Kangta, released on August 16, 2001, by S.M. Entertainment. In the "Polaris" music video, Kangta dressed as a woman.

Track listing

Notes

References

External links

 
 SM Entertainment's official website

2001 debut albums
Kangta albums
SM Entertainment albums
Jazz albums by South Korean artists
Jazz-pop albums